Beta Peak is a rock peak,  high, surmounting a small ice-free mesa  northeast of Pudding Butte, in the Prince Albert Mountains, Victoria Land. It was so named by the Southern Party of the New Zealand Geological Survey Antarctic Expedition, 1962–63, because they always referred to this feature throughout the season as "Station B".

References 

Mountains of Victoria Land
Scott Coast